Bălăbănești is a commune in Criuleni District, Moldova. It is composed of three villages: Bălăbănești, Mălăiești and Mălăieștii Noi.

References

Communes of Criuleni District